The plantation of Ulster in the 17th century led to many Scottish people settling in Ireland. These are the surnames of the original Scottish settlers from 1606 to 1641, who would go on to become the 'Scotch-Irish'.

A
Abercrombie 
Acheson 
Achmootie
Adair
Adams 
Agnew 
Aicken 
Alexander
Algeo 
Allen 
Allison
Anderson 
Andrews 
Arkles
Arnett 
Austin

B
Bailie 
Barbour 
Barkley 
Barr 
Barry 
Bauld 
Beattie
Bell 
Black 
Blackwood 
Blair 
Boyd 
Boyle 
Bozwell 
Brackley
Brisbane 
Brown 
Bruce 
Bryce 
Buchanan 
Burke 
Burne 
Burns 
Buthill

C
Cahoon
Calte 
Calwell 
Campbell 
Carcott 
Carlile
Carmichael 
Carothers 
Carr 
Carslaw 
Carson 
Cathcart 
Catherwood 
Cawder 
Chambers 
Clapham 
Clendinning 
Cloggie
Coch 
Colquhoun 
Colville 
Consiglia
Cooper 
Cowan
Cowper 
Craig 
Crawford 
Creighton 
Creire 
Crosby 
Cunningham 
Cummings
Cuthbertson

D
Danielston
Davidson 
Davyson 
Deans 
Deinbone 
Demstar 
Dewar 
Dick 
Dickson 
Doninge 
Dougal 
Douglas 
Dowling 
Drum 
Drummond 
Dunbar 
Dunlop 
Dunne 
Dunsayer 
Dykes

E
Echlin 
Edmonston
Edwards 
Ekyn 
Elliott 
Ellis 
Elpinstone 
Eames
English 
Erving 
Ewart

F
Farquhar
Farquharson
Fenton 
Ferguson 
Ferly 
Ferry 
Forester 
Fingleton 
Finlay 
Flack 
Fleming 
Forecheade 
Forsith (Forsyth/Forsythe)
Frazer 
Freeborne 
Fullerton 
Fulton 
Futhie 
Fyieff

G
Gaate 
Galbraith 
Galt 
Galway
Gamble 
Gemmil
Gibb 
Gibson 
Gillaspie 
Gilmore 
Glass 
Glen 
Glye 
Gordon 
Graham 
Granger 
Granton 
Gray 
Greenshields 
Greer 
Grindall
Gryme 
Gryn
Glenney

H
Haldane 
Hall 
Hamill 
Hamilton 
Harne 
Harper 
Harvey 
Hatrick 
Heigate 
Henderson 
Hendrie 
Hendry 
Henrison
Henry 
Hepburn 
Highgate 
Hilton 
Hogg 
Holmes 
Honis 
Hood 
Hope 
Howell 
Howie 
Howson 
Hudgsone 
Huggin 
Hunter 
Hutchine

J
Johnson 
Johnston 
Julius
Jess

K
Karns
Kee
Keeland 
Kelso 
Kennedy 
Karnes 
Kilpatrick 
Kinnear 
Knox 
Kuming 
Kyd 
Kyle

L
Laderdeill 
Lainge 
Lauder 
Lawes 
Lawson 
Laycock 
Leckey
Leech 
Leitch 
Leslie 
Lindsay 
Livingstone 
Lockhard 
Lodge 
Logan 
Logy 
Lother 
Love 
Luke 
Lutfoot 
Lynn 
Lyon

M, Mac, Mc
MacDonald
Machell
Machen 
MacIntyre 
Mackeson 
Macklelland (McClellan/McClelland) 
Magee
Maghan 
Maginnes
Martin 
Mathysin (Matheson)
Maxwell 
McAlexander 
McAula
McAulay 
McAuld 
McBurney 
McCamuel 
McCartney 
McCashin 
McCassick 
McCausland 
McCawley 
McClairne
McCoy
McCreaghan 
McCrery 
McCullough 
McDonnell 
McDougall 
McDowell 
McErdy 
McEvene 
McEwen 
McFarland 
McGee 
McGern 
McGowan 
McIlchany 
McIlmurry 
McIlveyne
McIlwrath 
McKaudy 
McKay 
McKearne 
McKee 
McKernan
McKilmun 
McKinney 
McKittrick 
McKnight
McKym 
McLellan 
McLintagh (McClintock)
McLoghery 
McLornan 
McMakene 
McMath
McMillin 
McNaughton 
McNeill 
McNilly 
McPhedrish
McVegany 
Means 
Meen 
Melvin 
Mikell 
Millar 
Miller 
Mitchell 
Moffatt 
Molsed 
Moncrieg 
Monett 
Moneypenny 
Montgomery 
Moon 
Moore 
Moorhead 
Morgan 
Morne 
Morrison 
Morrow
Morton 
Mowlane 
Muntreeth 
Murdogh 
Murduff 
Mure 
Murray 
Musgrave

N
Nelson
Nesbit 
Nevin 
Newburgh 
Niven 
Norris
Nicholl

O
Orr

P
Paddin 
Parke 
Parker 
Paton 
Patton
Patoun 
Patterson 
Peacock 
Peebles 
Peere 
Petticrew 
Plowright 
Pollock 
Pont 
Pooke 
Power 
Price 
Pringle 
Purveyance

R
Rae
Ralston 
Ramsay 
Rankin 
Read 
Redgate 
Reid 
Richardson 
Riddell
Ritchie 
Robb 
Robert 
Robin 
Robinson 
Robson 
Rodgers 
Roger 
Rose 
Rudd 
Russell

S
Sare
Saunderson 
Savage 
Sawer 
Sayne 
Scott 
Semple 
Seton 
Sharpe 
Shaw 
Shirloe 
Simpson 
Skingeor 
Smelley 
Smellham 
Smith 
Smyth 
Somervell 
Spence 
Spier 
Spottiswood 
Stanehouse
Stanton 
Steele 
Stephenson 
Stevenson 
Stevin 
Stewart 
Strawbridge 
Sturgeon 
Sutherland
Symington 
Symonson 
Syne

T
Tate 
Taylor 
Tees
Thomas 
Thompson 
Thomson
Todd 
Trail 
Trane 
Trench 
Trimble 
Tullis

U
Udney

V
Valentine 
Vance

W
Waddell 
Walker 
Wallace 
Wallis
Walshe 
Walson 
Wanchop 
Wardlaw 
Watson 
Weir 
Welsh
Wightman 
Wigton 
Wilkie 
Williamson 
Wilson 
Witherspoon 
Wood 
Woodburn
Woolson 
Wright 
Wylie 
Wyms

Y
Young

References

Culture of Northern Ireland